Halk TV is a Turkish nationwide TV channel established in 2005. It is known for its relationship with the Republican People's Party (abbreviated CHP), although the previous links were cut off in 2011 under a new CHP leader. The Gezi Park protests brought Halk TV into the spotlight as one of the few Turkish television channels to broadcast live coverage of the events. Because of this, the Turkish TV regulator RTÜK (Turkish: Radyo ve  Televizyon Üst Kurulu) imposed a fine on Halk TV for "harming the physical, moral and mental development of children and young people".

History
Halk TV was established in 2005 "by former CHP accountant Mahmut Yıldız" and received some funding from CHP. When Kemal Kılıçdaroğlu took over the CHP leadership in 2011, CHP cut its funding, leading to severe financial difficulties for Halk TV. Kılıçdaroğlu also asked CHP deputies and members not to appear as guests on the station. Former Esenyurt Mayor Gürbüz Çapan was linked with Halk TV in 2011.

In May 2013 Halk TV was reprimanded by the media regulator RTÜK for broadcasting a "most watched" video from YouTube which it said was aimed at humiliating PM Recep Tayyip Erdoğan.

In early 2020, Halk TV was sold to business man Cafer Mahiroğlu.

References

External links 

Television stations in Turkey
Television channels and stations established in 2005